is a 16th century English ship, sunk, recovered and preserved in Portsmouth

Mary Rose or variations may also refer to:
 , ships of the Royal Navy named "Mary Rose"
 Mary Rose Trust, Portsmouth, England, UK; a limited trust for the preservation of the 16th-century Mary Rose carrack
 Mary Rose Museum, Portsmouth, England, UK; the museum housing the 16th-century Mary Rose carrack

People

Given name "Mary" surname "Rose"
 Mary Swartz Rose (1874–1941) U.S. scientist, nutritionist, dietician

Given name "Mary Rose", "Maryrose"
 Mary Rose Columba Adams (1832—1891), British catholic prioress
 Mary Rose Alpers (1906–2002; née Coulton), British novelist
 Mary Rose Barrington (1926–2020), British parapsychologist and barrister
 Mary Rose Hill Burton (1859–1900), British artist
 Mary Rose Byrne (born 1979), Australian actress
 Mary Rose Callaghan (born 1944), Irish novelist
 Maryrose Crook (née Wilkinson), New Zealand musician
 Mary Rose Gearty, Irish judge
 Mary Rose Gliksten, British politician
 Mary-Rose MacColl (born 1961), Australian novelist
 Mary Rose McGeady (1928–2012), U.S. catholic sister
 Mary Rose McGee (1917–2004), U.S. politician
 Mary Rose O'Reilley, U.S. poet
 Mary Rose Oakar (born 1940), U.S. politician
 Maryrose Reeves Allen (1899–1992), U.S. physical educator
 Mary Rose Thacker (1922–1983), Canadian figure skater
 Mary Rose-Anna Travers (1894–1941), French-Canadian singer
 Mary Rose Tuitt (1930–2005), Montserrat politician
 Mary Rose Tully (1946–2010), U.S. lactation consultant
 Mary Rose Young (born 1958), British ceramics artist
 Priscilla Mary Rose Curzon (born 1940), daughter of Edward Curzon, 6th Earl Howe 
 Eimear Mary Rose Quinn (born 1972), Irish singer

Fictional characters
 Mary Rose, the titular character of the J.M. Barrie play Mary Rose (play)

Other uses
 Mary Rose (play), a play by J.M. Barrie

See also 
 
 

Marie Rose (disambiguation)
 Rosemary (disambiguation)
 Mary (disambiguation)
 Rose (disambiguation)